The 1999 Niger State gubernatorial election occurred in Nigeria on January 9, 1999. The PDP nominee Abdulkadir Kure won the election, defeating the APP candidate.

Abdulkadir Kure emerged PDP candidate.

Electoral system
The Governor of Niger State is elected using the plurality voting system.

Primary election

PDP primary
The PDP primary election was won by Abdulkadir Kure.

Results
The total number of registered voters in the state was 1,553,303. Total number of votes cast was 786,979 while number of valid votes was 764,646. Rejected votes were 22,334.

References 

Niger State gubernatorial elections
Niger State gubernatorial election
Niger State gubernatorial election
Niger State gubernatorial election